Saint-Jean-de-la-Forêt is a former commune in the Orne department in north-western France. On 1 January 2016, it was merged into the new commune of Perche en Nocé. Its population was 158 in 2019.

See also
Communes of the Orne department

References

Saintjeandelaforet